Beverley was an electoral district of the Legislative Assembly in the Australian state of Western Australia from 1890 to 1950.

The district was based on the rural town of Beverley lying to the east of Perth. It was one of the original 30 seats contested at the 1890 election. In 1898, it included Beverley and several other settlements along the Great Southern Railway, including Seabrook, Moorumbine, and Pingelly, as well as Narembeen farther west.

Beverley was abolished at the 1950 election; its final member, James Mann, was transferred to the seat of Avon Valley.

Members

Election results

References

Beverley
1890 establishments in Australia
1950 disestablishments in Australia
Constituencies established in 1890
Constituencies disestablished in 1950